Shero Feroz (Sindhi: شهرو فيروز) is a Pakistani film released on 18 October 1968. Produced by Khadim Films (a film production company founded by the brothers Ali Baloch and Khadim Hussain Baloch), it was directed by Shaikh Hassan and launched the career of two famous Sindhi actors, Meh Parah and Mushtaq Changezi.

See also
 Sindhi cinema
 List of Sindhi-language films

Further reading
 Gazdar, Mushtaq. 1997. Pakistan Cinema, 1947-1997. Karachi: Oxford University Press.

References

Sindhi-language films
Pakistani black-and-white films
Pakistani historical films